La Seyne-sur-Mer ("La Seyne on Sea"), or simply La Seyne, is a commune in the Var department in the Provence-Alpes-Côte d'Azur region in Southeastern France. In 2018, it had a population of 62,888. La Seyne-sur-Mer, which is part of the agglomeration of Toulon, is situated adjacent to the west of the city.

Demographics
The population data in the table and graph below refer to the commune of La Seyne-sur-Mer proper, in its geography at the given years. The commune ceded territory to the new commune of Saint-Mandrier-sur-Mer in 1950.

Economy

La Seyne-sur-Mer  owed its importance to the shipbuilding trade, the Société des Forges et Chantiers de la Mediterranée having here one of the finest shipbuilding yards in Europe (it is a branch of the larger establishment at Marseille), which gave employment to about 3,000 workers.

In recent years the town has moved from its traditional industries to tourism. The docks previously used have had extensive work and now comprise a park, marinas and a new (2010) hotel overlooking Toulon and the marinas.

The population is diverse in origins and the outer suburbs are undergoing a transformation with old multi storey apartments being replaced with modern developments. La Seyne has a railway station, Gare de La Seyne-Six-Fours, on the line from Toulon to Marseille.

Iraq's "Osiris class" nuclear reactors, later destroyed by Israel in Operation Opera, were built in La Seyne-sur-Mer.

Buildings and structures
 Pont basculant de la Seyne-sur-Mer, a former bascule bridge.
 Institut Michel-Pacha, a building in the néo-mauresque style which hosted a research laboratory in marine biology from 1900 until 2008.

Personalities linked to La Seyne-sur-Mer
 Jean Gaspard de Vence (1747–1808)
 Napoléon Bonaparte (1769–1821)
 George Sand (1804–1876)
 Michel Pacha (1819–1907)
 Henri Rieunier (1833–1918)
 Maurice Tranchant de Lunel (1869-1944), French architect died in La Seyne
 Jean Marquet (1883–1954)
 Henri Olive Tamari (1898–1980)
 Édouard Jauffret (1900–1945)
 Fernand Bonifay (1920–1993)
 Gabriel Pérès (1920–2004)
 Pierre Moustiers (1924–2016)
 Johannès Galland (1934)
 Henri Tisot (1937–2011)
 Andrzej "André" Orliński (1954), Polish adventurer, musician and philosopher
 Valerie Hirschfield  (1964)
 Léon Loppy (1966)
 Marcus Malte (1967)
 Frédéric Meyrieu (1968)
 Gérald Orsoni (1972)
 Patrice Collazo (1974)
 Marc Zanotti (1975)
 Sylvain Prudhomme (1979), French writer
 Sébastien Squillaci (1980)
 Mohamed Sy (1980)
 Camille Traversa (1981)
 Pascal Ragondet (1983)
 John Revox (1983)
 Sébastien Bisciglia (1984)
 Alexis Farjaudon (1985)
 Bafétimbi Gomis (1985), footballer currently playing for Al-Hilal FC
 Fabien Lamatina (1985)
 Pier-Nicol Feldis (1986)
 Jérôme J. Dufourg (1986)
 Bruno Lancelle (1986)
 Emmanuel Ragondet (1987)
 Mickaël Ivaldi (1990)
 Nampalys Mendy (1992)
 Gaël Fickou  (1994)

See also
Communes of the Var department

References

External links

 Official website
 LaSeyne.Info
 Tourist office website
 Personal website about the history of La Seyne-sur-Mer 
 Website about the history and directory of La Seyne-sur-Mer  

Communes of Var (department)
Populated coastal places in France